Adishchevo is a rural locality (a village) in Dobryansky District, Perm Krai, Russia. The population was 4 as of 2010. There are 15 streets.

Geography 
Adishchevo is located 45 km south of Dobryanka (the district's administrative centre) by road. Palniki is the nearest rural locality.

References 

Rural localities in Dobryansky District